Thoinot Arbeau is the anagrammatic pen name of French cleric Jehan Tabourot (March 17, 1520 – July 23, 1595). Tabourot is most famous for his Orchésographie, a study of late sixteenth-century French Renaissance social dance.  He was born in Dijon and died in Langres.

Orchésographie and other work
Orchésographie, first published in Langres, 1589, provides information on social ballroom behaviour and on the interaction of musicians and dancers. It is available online in facsimile and in plain text. There is an English translation by Mary Stewart Evans, edited by Julia Sutton, in print with Dover Publications. It contains numerous woodcuts of dancers and musicians and includes many dance tabulations in which extensive instructions for the steps are lined up next to the musical notes, a significant innovation in dance notation at that time.

He also published on astronomy: Compot et Manuel Kalendrier, par lequel toutes personnes peuvent facilement apprendre et sçavoir le cours du Soleil et de la Lune et semblablement les festes fixes et mobiles que l’on doit célébrer en l’Eglise, suyvant la correction ordonné par notre Saint Pére Grégoire XIII [...Calendar, by which all people can easily learn and know the course of the Sun and of the Moon and similarly, the festivals with fixed and moveable dates which one celebrates in Church, according to the correction ordained by our Father Saint Gregory XIII], Langres: Jehan des Preyz, 1582, (cited in Mémoires de l'Académie des sciences, arts et belles-lettres de Dijon, I (Dijon: Académie de Dijon, 1924), 107).

Thoinot Arbeau was translated into English as Orchesography by Cyril W. Beaumont in 1925, and in a modern edition in 1967.

The pavane "Belle qui tiens ma vie" was arranged by Leo Delibes for his incidental music for Victor Hugo's play "Le roi s'amuse". 
Other sections were arranged or quoted by Saint-Saens (in the "ballet" from Ascanio) and Peter Warlock (in his Capriol Suite) 

"Branle de l'Official" provided the tune for the 20th century English Christmas carol "Ding Dong Merrily on High".

Notes

Further reading
Kendall, G. Yvonne. 2001. "Arbeau, Thoinot". The New Grove Dictionary of Music and Musicians, second edition, edited by Stanley Sadie and John Tyrrell. London: Macmillan Publishers.

External links

 
 Orchésographie 
 Scans of the woodcuts
 Orchesographie From the Collections at the Library of Congress 
 Arbeau free sheet music including Pavanne
 
 
Free scores Mutopia Project
Orchesographie. Et traicte en forme de dialogue, par leqvel tovtes personnes pevvent facilement apprendre & practiquer l'honneste exercice des dances. Par Thoinot Arbeau demeurant à Lengres. Lengres, Imprimé par Iehan des Preyz, 1589. From the Rare Book and Special Collections Division at the Library of Congress
["Pavane" https://www.youtube.com/watch?v=_3ctkKhfC6Y] "Belle qui tient ma vie" performed by Esther Ofarim

1520 births
1595 deaths
Renaissance dance
Dance notators
Clergy from Dijon
16th-century French Roman Catholic priests
French didactic writers
16th-century French writers
16th-century male writers
French male non-fiction writers
Writers from Dijon